The Merafong City Local Municipality council consists of fifty-five members elected by mixed-member proportional representation. Twenty-eight councillors are elected by first-past-the-post voting in twenty-eight wards, while the remaining twenty-seven are chosen from party lists so that the total number of party representatives is proportional to the number of votes received. In the election of 1 November 2021, the African National Congress (ANC) lost their majority of seats on the council

Results 
The following table shows the composition of the council after past elections.

December 2000 election

The following table shows the results of the 2000 election.

March 2006 election

The following table shows the results of the 2006 election.

May 2011 election

The following table shows the results of the 2011 election.

August 2016 election

The following table shows the results of the 2016 election.

November 2021 election

The following table shows the results of the 2021 election.

By-elections from November 2021
The following by-elections were held to fill vacant ward seats in the period from November 2021.

After the murder of ward 4's independent councillor, Thabo Malatjie, in Lesotho, a by-election was held on 30 November. The ANC regained the seat, winning 62% of the vote.

References

Merafong City
West Rand District Municipality